The 2015–16 season was Oud-Heverlee Leuven's 14th competitive season in professional football and the team's fourth season in the Belgian Pro League. Following a loss on the final day of the regular season at home against Club Brugge, OH Leuven dropped into 16th place and was relegated as Westerlo beat Waasland-Beveren. OH Leuven also had a mediocre cup run, struggling past Belgian Second Division team Lommel United before falling 1-0 to Mouscron-Péruwelz.

2015–16 squad
 This section lists players who were in Oud-Heveree Leuven's first team squad at any point during the 2015–16 season
 The symbol § indicates player left mid-season
 The symbol # indicates player joined mid-season
 Italics indicate loan player

Transfers

Following the promotion from the Belgian Second Division on 26 May 2015 by virtue of winning the play-offs, only few players were deemed capable of competing at the highest level. The squad consisted of many decent players, but at least ten new players would need to be signed and only former Belgian international goalkeeper Logan Bailly and young wingback Dion Cools were often named as having sufficient skills. Both players would leave OH Leuven throughout the summer however, as Bailly was signed as a back-up for Craig Gordon by Scottish giants Celtic, while 19-year-old Cools was signed by Club Brugge because of his great potential. Other departures included fan favorite Kenny Thompson and striker on loan Giuseppe Rossini who had both announced their departure before the promotion was achieved  while secondary striker Ibrahim Somé and young goalkeeper Senne Vits also left the team soon after the promotion as they were signed by WS Brussels and Standard Liège respectively. The contracts of Abdul-Yakuni Iddi, David Wijns and Ben Yagan were not renewed and the players released, while youngster Simon Bracke was loaned to Second Division team ASV Geel and defender Matthias Trenson was given a free transfer to Belgian Third Division team Hasselt.

Following all these departures, OH Leuven was forced to sign several new players to strengthen the squad. Mid-June three signings were announced, including return of popular winger and former OH Leuven player Jordan Remacle who was part of the 2010–11 Belgian Second Division title winning team, scoring 15 league goals that season, the signing of 23-year old defender Pierre-Yves Ngawa from relegated side Lierse and the 2014–15 Belgian Second Division top scorer Romero Regales. In July, manager Jacky Mathijssen brought in 21-year old Greek defender Konstantinos Rougalas, who he had worked with two years earlier when they were together at Fostiras and announced the loan deals of no less than four midfielders: Samuel Asamoah, Kenneth Houdret, Leandro Trossard and Slobodan Urošević. With the departure of first goalkeeper Logan Bailly and reserve keeper Senne Vits, the team was down to two goalkeepers, Yves Lenaerts and Nick Gillekens, leading to the signing of French experienced 35-year old goalkeeper Rudy Riou, who would turn out to become the first goalkeeper, with Lenaerts his backup.

Towards the end of the summer 2015 transfer window, OH Leuven loaned Ukrainian defender Oleksandr Volovyk from Shakhtar Donetsk and signed wingback Pieterjan Monteyne and striker Kim Ojo. This in turn led to the departure of Olivier Lusamba who was given a free transfer, while both Yohan Brouckaert and Kenneth Van Goethem were loaned out to Belgian Second Division teams as they were unlikely to be getting much time on the field. Defender Kenny Van Hoevelen was also deemed surplus, but remained in the squad and would not play a single minute throughout the season, except for matches with the reserves.

In the weeks prior to the winter 2015–16 transfer window, OHL signed free agent player Jean Calvé as a backup for Pierre-Yves Ngawa  while releasing midfielder Kevin Tapoko after his contract was terminated by mutual consent, while during the transfer window itself defender David Vandenbroeck opted to leave the team as he did not receive much playing time. He was replaced by experienced Brazilian defender Kanu who already knew the Belgian competition after playing three seasons with Standard Liège earlier in his career. OH Leuven had also announced the arrival of Serbian midfielder Marko Poletanović on loan from Gent, however the deal did not materialize as the player did not agree to the transfer. Towards the end of the transfer window, youngster Charni Ekangamene was loaned from Zulte Waregem instead.

Transfers In

Transfers Out

Pre-season
In the month following the promotion to the Belgian Pro League, OH Leuven renewed partnerships with several of its sponsors. They first confirmed extended partnerships with Rayden Transport, Tegelconcept, GMS-Group and Dataflow before announcing Just Eat as the new lead shirt sponsor replacing Option, the company led by former OHL chairman Jan Callewaert. A few weeks later, Federale Verzekering also prolongs its sponsorship agreement, followed by Eneco, coming in as a new sponsor at the start of season. Meanwhile, Patrick De Wilde was brought into the staff as technical coordinator and the players are required to return to training on 22 June 2015.

On 8 June 2015, the Belgian Pro League fixtures for the 2015–16 season are announced. Oud-Heverlee Leuven opens the season with an away match to Genk on 25 July 2015, while Anderlecht will be the first opponent to come and play at Den Dreef on matchday 2. One week later, the appointed commission of the Royal Belgian Football Association approves the planned reform of the Belgian football league system which will mean that in contrast to the previous seasons only the team finishing in last position will relegate from the Belgian Pro League, while the team in 15th place will be safe.

OHL kicks of the series of friendlies with three matches against local teams from lower divisions. The first game results in a 0-12 victory away to sixth division team Linden, a match in which no less than 21 players were used. Five players did not play due to minor injuries, including Logan Bailly, Yohan Brouckaert and newcomers Romero Regales and Jordan Remacle. Four days later against a very defensive Kortenberg, also playing in the sixth division, the match went much more difficult, with OHL only managing to score two goals prompting coach Jacky Mathijssen to state that "it was a bit dull" and that "he expected more of his players". Three days later, at temperatures close to 30 degrees Celsius, the team beat Bierbeek from the fifth division by four goals to one. Following a week of training, OHL lost its first match of the season away to Belgian Second Division team Heist, with John Bostock scoring the consolation goal from a penalty kick, which was followed by a 0-3 win against Cercle Brugge three days later, with Jovan Kostovski working hard and scoring twice. On 15 July 2015, a 1-1 draw was obtained against Belgian Fourth Division team Tessenderlo in a match which featured mostly the players that had not received much playing time thus far, including a first starting lineup position for new striker Romero Regales. Following the match, assistant coach Hans Vander Elst states that "except for Yohan Brouckaert, everyone will be fit for the start of the season". Named as the dress rehearsal match, the friendly against Differdange from Luxembourg was seen as the final test to prepare for the start of the competition. Jordan Remacle scored twice before halftime, while Croizet, Houdret, Regales and Sula each added one more goal in a convincing 1-6 away win.

Belgian Pro League

OHL's fourth season in the Belgian Pro League began on 25 July 2015.

Results

League table

Belgian Cup

OH Leuven were drawn at home to Belgian Second Division side Lommel United in the sixth round of the 2015–16 Belgian Cup. The game saw four players score against their former team, as Cerigioni, Trossard and Regales each scored in the first half for OH Leuven while on the other side former OHL player Wouter Scheelen scored through a stunning long range shot. Christophe Bertjens scored the second goal for Lommel United in the second half and after OHL failed to score following several opportunities, Brandon Deville nearly equalized in the last minute but his shot went high over the target which allowed OHL to progress. The seventh round saw OH Leuven play away at Mouscron-Péruwelz, in a game which took place just three days before the important relegation clash against Westerlo, causing Emilio Ferrera to leave regulars John Bostock, Yohan Croizet, Flavien Le Postollec, Jordan Remacle and Leandro Trossard out of the starting lineup. Mouscron-Péruwelz started strongly, creating several chances with both Tristan Dingomé and Filip Marković coming close to the opening goal in the first few minutes. The goal eventually came after 16 minutes when a free kick by François Marquet, carried by the wind, floated over all players and Rudy Riou straight into the goal. Kenneth Houdret and Pierre-Yves Ngawa came closest in the first half to equalize for OH Leuven but did not succeed. In a dull second half, the OH Leuven players seemed to be thinking more of the upcoming clash with Westerlo not creating chances, while Mouscron-Péruwelz was happy to defend their one-goal lead instead of pushing for more.

Results

Season Friendlies
During the season, OH Leuven played several friendlies. The traditional friendlies occurred early September (against Genk) to bridge the gap caused by the international matches and in the beginning of January following the short winter break. The other friendlies were the result of the 2016 reform of the Belgian football league system, which meant that following the 2015–16 Belgian Pro League regular season, the team had no more official matches from mid March until the beginning of the next season, effectively a four-month break. To bridge the gap, the team organised a series of friendlies in March, April and May which supporters could attend for free. On 20 April OHL invited several players on trial to participate in the match against Belgian Fourth Division team Francs Borains.

Matchday squads
The following lineups were used by Oud-Heverlee Leuven during the season.

References

External links
 

2015-16
Belgian football clubs 2015–16 season
Oud-Heverlee Leuven seasons